Muerte (Spanish word for "Death") is the sixth studio album by hardcore punk/heavy metal band Will Haven. It was released in 2018 on Minus Head Records. It is the first album in which keyboardist Adrien Contreras plays bass guitar. The album was well received by critics. Vocalist Grady Avenell has talked about Muerte being the final album by the band, though that has yet to be officially confirmed.

Track listing

Personnel
Will Haven
Grady Avenell – vocals
Jeff Irwin – guitar
Anthony Paganelli – guitar
Adrien Contreras – bass, keyboards
Mitch Wheeler – drums

Guests
Mike Scheidt – vocals on "No Escape"
Stephen Carpenter – guitar on "El Sol"

References

2018 albums
Will Haven albums